Garuda is a 2004 Thai kaiju film directed by Monthon Arayangkoon.

Plot 

The discovery of a mysterious fossil sets the stage for a terrifying confrontation between modern day man and Thai folklore. A tunnel excavation has revealed a rock so dense that it cannot be penetrated by even the strongest drill. When the workers discover a collection of unrecognizable fossils that bear no similarities to the familiar dinosaur types, they enlist the aid of archeologist Lenna Pierre and her American partner Tim in revealing the origins of the mysterious geological find. Awakened by the large scale excavation and enraged at having been trapped beneath the Bangkok concrete for hundreds of years, the ancient Garuda sets out on a bloody rampage as Leena, Tim, and the military struggle to find a means of bringing Garuda's destructive reign of terror to an end.

Release

Garuda was released in North America on Video on Demand in 2007, then later on DVD by Tokyo Shock.

Reception

Critical reception for the film is mostly negative.

Dread Central awarded the film a score of 2 / 4, criticizing the film's acting, and special effects.
 
Joseph Savitski from Beyond Hollywood.com gave the film a negative review, stating, "Garuda had potential to be a great monster movie. Most of the film’s faults can be attributed to oftentimes sloppy direction and editing by the writer/director, whose own script barely makes any sense. This is too bad, because “Garuda” has decent special effects, as well as an appealing female lead in Sara Legge. Unfortunately, like most monster movies, “Garuda” ends up treading formula instead of creating new ones, resulting in a film that doesn't stand out from the crowd".

Adam Arseneau from DVD Verdict gave the film a negative review, criticizing the film's poor plot, bad acting, poorly executed special effects, and overuse of action film clichés.

References

External links
 
 
 

2004 films
2004 fantasy films
Thai-language films
Kaiju films
2000s monster movies
Thai monster movies
Films set in 2005
Thai science fiction films
2000s science fiction horror films
Films set in Bangkok
Hindu mythological films
2000s Japanese films